The Korea Game Awards is an annual South Korean awards ceremony that recognizes "individuals and businesses that have contributed to domestic game industry." The ceremony is organized by the Korea Association of Game Industry (K-GAMES) and presented by the Ministry of Culture, Sports and Tourism, The Electronic Times and The Sports Chosun in conjunction with the G-Star game trade fair held in Busan in November. It is the largest and most prestigious awards ceremony for games in the country, and has been held yearly since 1996.

Winners are decided by a combination of judges, game experts and online votes. The Grand Prize, given to the overall best game of the year (also called the President's Award) has historically been won almost exclusively by PC games; 2004's Kingdom Under Fire: The Crusaders is the only console game to win the award. However, in 2014, Blade for Kakao became the first mobile game to win, and since then several mobile games have won the award.

Winners of the Grand Prize (President's Award)

References 

1996 establishments in South Korea
Awards established in 1996
Video game awards
Video gaming in South Korea